Hot Show is the debut studio album by Canadian pop duo Prozzäk. It was released through Epic Records on 2 November 1998 in Canada, and 17 August 1999 in the United States.

The album was very successful in Canada, being certified Triple Platinum in the country. Hot Show was also nominated for "Best Album" at the 2000 Juno Awards, while "Sucks to Be You" was nominated for "Best Single", and "Strange Disease" for "Best Video". Between 1996 and 2016, Hot Show was among the top 60 best-selling albums by Canadian artists in Canada.

Track listing
 "Intro" – 0:08
 "Europa" – 3:30
 "Strange Disease" – 3:26
 "Omobolasire" – 3:41
 "Shag Tag (You're It!)" – 3:59
 "Hot Show" – 4:08
 "Mediterranean Lady" – 4:05
 "Wild Thing-Poor Boy (Medley)" – 2:49
 "Sucks to Be You" – 3:21
 "New York" – 4:07
 "I Like to Watch (Milo's Night Out)" – 3:01
 "Tsunami" – 3:46
 "Sleep with Myself" – 3:55
 "Anna-Lisa" – 3:56
 "Simon's Final Thought" – 1:15

Personnel
 Jason Levine - vocals, strings, string arrangements, producer
 James McCollum - strings, string arrangements, producer
 Jon Levine - wurlitzer
 Stephan Moccio - piano, keyboards
 Lenny DeRose - mixing, engineer, producer
 Jeff Dalziel - engineer, producer
 Kenny Moran - assistant engineer
 Blair Robb - programming
 P. Letros - mastering
 Amber Meredith - editing
 Tanya Nagowski - production coordination
 Chris Frazer Smith - management
 Mike Roth - A&R
 Scott Harder - illustrations

Year-end charts

Release history

Notes 

1998 albums
Epic Records albums
Prozzäk albums